8th seed Michael Berrer won the first edition of the event against Nicolas Mahut in three sets 1–6, 6–4, 6–3.

Seeds

Draw

Finals

Top half

Bottom half

References
 Main Draw
 Qualifying Draw

Internationaux de Tennis de Vendee - Singles
2013 Singles